The China Railways SL11 (勝利11, Shènglì, "victory") class steam locomotive was a class of 4-6-2 passenger steam locomotives operated by the China Railway. They were originally built for the South Manchuria Railway and the Manchukuo National Railway by ALCO of the United States in 1908, and have the distinction of being part of the first group of standard gauge locomotives to operate in northeastern China.

History
The first Pacifics to be delivered to Mantetsu were the seven class "G" locomotives built by ALCO at their Richmond works. These were part of the first group of locomotives bought by Mantetsu after conversion to standard gauge. They entered service in 1908, hauling express trains made up of Pullman cars between Dalian and Changchun put into service that year. These trains originally ran twice weekly, but were later increased to three, then four, trips each week, though during the First World War service was reduced to one train per week. These locomotives were occasionally used for mixed trains on the Anfeng Line. 

Between 1920 and 1926 they were rebuilt with superheaters, but with the arrival of newer types - and the increase in passenger traffic - they came to be used on all sorts of passenger trains on the trunk lines. Immediately after the Mukden Incident four were lent out to another railway. In 1933, six were transferred to the Manchukuo National Railway, where they were used on the construction of new lines, along with regular passenger duties. Due to the axleload of the Pashina class being too heavy for use on the mainline north of Xinjing (Changchun), after the extension of the Asia Express to Harbin in 1935, the Pashii class was used on the Xinjing–Harbin section, which was formally owned by the MNR. 

In the 1920 classification system they were designated Pashii class (パシイ); those transferred to the MNR in 1933 were reclassified Pashiko (パシコ) class. In the unified classification scheme of 1938 they returned to the Pashii designation.

Postwar
Of the seven Pashii class locomotives, at the end of the Pacific War six were assigned to the Jinzhou Railway Bureau and one was on loan to another railway. All seven eventually ended up with the China Railway, becoming class ㄆㄒ11 (PX11) in 1951, and class SL11 in 1959.

References

4-6-2 locomotives
ALCO locomotives
Railway locomotives introduced in 1908
Steam locomotives of China
Standard gauge locomotives of China
Rolling stock of Manchukuo
Passenger locomotives